Pertl is a German surname. Notable people with the surname include:

 Anna Maria Mozart (1720–1778), née Pertl, mother of Wolfgang Amadeus Mozart
 Adrian Pertl (born 1996), Austrian alpine skier

See also
 Pöltl

German-language surnames